WKJH-LP is a radio station licensed to Bryan, Ohio, broadcasting on 103.5 MHz FM. WKJH-LP airs a Southern Gospel format and is owned by Lighthouse Ministries of Northwest Ohio.

On March 8, 2021, the FCC fined the station $3,500 for not filing their license renewal application by the deadline, and for operating after their license had expired.

References

External links
WKJH-LP's website

KJH-LP
Radio stations established in 2002
2002 establishments in Ohio
Southern Gospel radio stations in the United States
KJH-LP